Terzorio is a comune (municipality) in the Province of Imperia in the Italian region Liguria, located about  southwest of Genoa and about  southwest of Imperia.

Terzorio borders the following municipalities: Cipressa, Pompeiana, and Santo Stefano al Mare.

Population and Demographics 
As of 31 December 2004, Terzorio had a population of 208.

References

External links
 Comune di Terzorio (Official Webpage)

Cities and towns in Liguria